Maruina is a genus of moth flies in the family Psychodidae. There are at least 30 described species in Maruina. marui, diminutive for a fly.

Species

 Maruina amada Hogue, 1973
 Maruina amadora Hogue, 1973
 Maruina barrettoi Bravo, 2005
 Maruina bellaca Hogue, 1973
 Maruina boulderina Vaillant, 1963
 Maruina caceresi Wagner, 1988
 Maruina cachita Hogue, 1973
 Maruina campesina Hogue, 1973
 Maruina chaborra Hogue, 1973
 Maruina chamaca Hogue, 1973
 Maruina chamaquita Hogue, 1973
 Maruina chica Hogue, 1973
 Maruina chiringa Hogue, 1990
 Maruina cholita Hogue, 1973
 Maruina cirrata Bravo & Araújo, 2018
 Maruina colombicana Wagner & Joost, 1994
 Maruina dama Hogue, 1973
 Maruina doncella Hogue, 1973
 Maruina duckhousei Bravo, 2005
 Maruina garota Hogue, 1973
 Maruina guria Bravo, 2004
 Maruina hirta Johannsen, 1938
 Maruina hoguei Wagner, 1993
 Maruina jezeki Bravo, 2005
 Maruina lanceolata (Kincaid, 1899)
 Maruina menina Bravo & Lago, 2004
 Maruina mollesi Vaillant, 1989
 Maruina muchacha Hogue, 1973
 Maruina mucugensis Bravo & Araújo, 2018
 Maruina namorada Hogue, 1973
 Maruina nina Hogue, 1973
 Maruina pebeta Ibáñez-Bernal, 1994
 Maruina pennaki Vaillant, 1963
 Maruina pilosella Müller, 1895
 Maruina querida Hogue, 1973
 Maruina spinosa Müller, 1895
 Maruina tica Hogue, 1973
 Maruina tobagensis Wagner, 1993
 Maruina ursula Müller, 1895
 Maruina vidamia Hogue, 1973

References

Psychodidae
Psychodomorpha genera
Taxa named by Fritz Müller